11824 Alpaidze, provisional designation , is a stony background asteroid from the middle region of the asteroid belt, approximately  in diameter. It was discovered on 16 September 1982, by Russian astronomer Lyudmila Chernykh at the Crimean Astrophysical Observatory, Nauchnyj, on the Crimean peninsula. The asteroid was named for Soviet General Galaktion Alpaidze.

Orbit and classification 

Alpaidze is a non-family asteroid from the main belt's background population. It orbits the Sun in the central main-belt at a distance of 1.8–3.4 AU once every 4 years and 3 months (1,563 days). Its orbit has an eccentricity of 0.31 and an inclination of 2° with respect to the ecliptic. The body's observation arc, however, begins with its official discovery observation.

Naming 

This minor planet was named after Georgian-born Soviet Lieutenant General Galaktion Alpaidze (1916–2006), Hero of the Soviet Union and laureate of the USSR State Prize. He was the head of the Plesetsk Cosmodrome in the 1960s and 1970s, where space crafts were tested. During his supervision, the Cosmodrome became the world's most active launch site in the world. The official naming citation was published by the Minor Planet Center on 2 April 2007.

Physical characteristics

Lightcurves 

In September 2009, two rotational lightcurves of Alpaidze were obtained from photometric observations made by astronomers at the Palomar Transient Factory, California.

Diameter and albedo 

The Collaborative Asteroid Lightcurve Link assumes an albedo of 0.10 – a compromise value between the stony (0.20) and carbonaceous (0.057) albedos for unknown asteroids in the 2.6–2.7 AU region of the main-belt – and calculates a diameter of 4.8 kilometers with an absolute magnitude of 14.7.

References

External links 
 Asteroid Lightcurve Database (LCDB), query form (info )
 Dictionary of Minor Planet Names, Google books
 Asteroids and comets rotation curves, CdR – Observatoire de Genève, Raoul Behrend
 Discovery Circumstances: Numbered Minor Planets (10001)-(15000) – Minor Planet Center
 
 

011824
Discoveries by Lyudmila Chernykh
Named minor planets
19820916